This is a list of television programs current broadcasts and former broadcasts by Indian television channel Gemini TV.

Current broadcasts

Dubbed

Non-fiction

Former broadcasts

Other Serials 
Gaju Poolu (2001)
Chandamama (2009)
Andhra Andagaallu (2007)
Ardharathri
Mayalamarati (2001)
Antarnethram
Avunu Vaalliddarokkate
Gaaraala Puthrudu
Gee Boomba (2005)
Premaku Subhalagnam (2008)
O Inti Katha (2005)
Talli Prema (2002)
Hello Brother
Punarjanma
Madhumaassam (2008)
Trisulam (2003)
Marmajalam
Aasachakram
Sarada
Siri Siri Muvvane
Premalo Nee Nenu
Neelambari
Santhiketan
Nimisham
Archana
Ammakosam (2002)
Brundavanam (2002)
Aadadi (2000–2001)
Necchelli
Kaniti Kanapadinidi
Sh Rahasyam
Dracula (2007)
Aadivaram Adavallaku Selavu Kavali (2000–2001)
Amruthavarsham (2009)
Subbarao Subbalakshmi (2002)
Ankuram (2006)
Kalikalayam (2008–2009)
Vichithra Katha Malika (2003)
Abhilasha 
Seethamaalakshmi (2002)
Triveni Sangamam (1997–1998)
Sunayana
Thoorpu Padamara
Gokulamlo Seetha (2006)
Theeram (2009–2010)
Vasantham
Sri Anjaneyam
Gangothri (2002–2003)
Aanandamanandamaaye (2007)
Puttinilla Mettinilla
Chandralekha (2009)

Acquired Serials

Former Broadcasts Dubbed Serials

Mythology Serials

Other Serials
Naagini (Season 1, 2, 3 & 4)
Kutumbam
Aalumagalu
Ma Inti Kalyanam
Maghadheera
Swargam
Pavitra Prema
Marapurani Katha
Madhubala
Nuvvu Naku Nachav
Oohala Pallakilo
Amma Nanna O Ammayi
Nuvve kavali
Gruhalakshmi
Mounamela Noyi
Bommalata
Chittemma
Gagana Kusumalu
Muthyala Muggu
Sampradayam
Nuvvu Nachav
Eswari
Mettala Savvadi
Mayuri
Kalasam
Kuthuru
Mudda Mandaram
Anjali
Aanandam
Sivayya
Edureetha
 Pinni
Athaleni Kodalu Uttamuralu
Saradha
Manam
Tasmath Jagratta
Aladdin Adbutha Deepam
Jyothi
Pinni 2
Nenu Naa Abhi
Jolaali
Brundavanam
Siva Parvathi
Jai Hanuman
Bommarillu
Nandini
Chandrakumari
Sakthi
Hrudayam
Bhayam Bhayam
Vijetha
Sthree
Ganga Yamuna Saraswati
Renuka
Krishnadasi
Peru Cheppava
Mahila
Maya
Vani Rani
Kutumbam
Srimathi Oka Bahumathi
Lakshmi
Jhansi

AVM Productions Dubbed Serials 

Aanandam Mee Choice (2000)
Akhila (2000–2001)
Jeevitham (2000–2001)
Kodalu Dhithina Kapuram (2002)
Nammakam (2001–2003)
Aasa (2003)
Swargam (2003–2007)
Paasam (2007)

Reality shows

Dharmapeetam (1998)
Talk Of The Town (1997–2007)
Kotha Cinema Guru
Nee Kosam
Yours Lovingly (1999)
Aascharyam
Suprabhatha Sandesam (1999)
Kusalama (1999)
Viswadarsanam (1999)
Jogi Brothers (1999)
Chithram Bhalare Vichithram (1999)
Gajibji Gapadhani (2001)
Vivaha Bandham (2011–2012)
Ammulu Inta Kammani Vanta (2010)
Coateswara Rao (2013-2014)
Sattana Dasanna (2001–2003)
Horlicks Saadade Sandadhi (2003–2004)
Aata Kavala Paata Kavala
Once More Please (2005)
Dance Baby Dance (2005, 2013)
Flashback (2005)
Saahasam Cheyara Dhimbhaka (2001-2005)

Bol Baby Bol (Seasons 1 – 11)

References 

Gemini
Gemini